Fight Batman Fight! is a 1973 Filipino Batman action-fantasy film produced by Pacific Films (Philippines).

It stars famous Philippine actors such as action star Victor Wood as Batman, Rod Navarro as Joker, comedians Roderick Paulate as Robin, German Moreno, Ike Lozada,  drama actresses Gloria Romero, Rosemarie Gil, Lotis Key as Cat Woman and Pinky Montilla as Bat Girl.

Plot

Cast

 Victor Wood as Batman
 Lotis Key as Catwoman
 Rod Navarro as Joker
 Pinky Montilla as Bat Girl
 Roderick Paulate as Robin
 Gloria Romero
 Rosemarie Gil
 Eva Linda
 Rossana Marquez
 Nick Romano
 Romy Diaz
 Ike Lozada
 German Moreno
 Danny Rojo
 Robert Talabis

External links

1973 films
1973 independent films
1970s fantasy action films
1970s superhero films
Unofficial Batman films
Philippine action films
Tagalog-language films
1970s American films